is a river in Hokkaidō, Japan.

Course
The river rises on the slopes of Kitami Fuji in the Kitami Mountains. It flows 33 km in a northerly direction until it flows into the Shokotsu River.

References

Rivers of Hokkaido
Rivers of Japan